Syed Shāh Rukn ad-Dīn was a 14th-century Sufi Muslim figure in the Sylhet region. Ruknuddin's name is associated with the propagation of Islam in Rajnagar. In 1315, he joined Shah Kamal Quhafa who was travelling to the Sylhet region to meet Shah Jalal and reunite with his father, Khwaja Burhanuddin Ketan.

Life
Ruknuddin was born in Baghdad in the 13th century. He is from the Arab tribe Quraysh. He joined his father, Syed Alauddin, who  came to Sylhet a decade earlier with Shah Jalal. Ruknuddin travelled with his brothers, Syed Baharuddin, Shah Tajuddin and Syed Shamsuddin in accompany of their maternal uncle, Shah Kamal Quhafa to meet Shah Jalal and then reunite with his father, Khwaja Burhanuddin Ketan. In 1312, they reached Sylhet and spent some time as a murid of Shah Jalal in Dargah Mahalla.

In June 1315, Jalal then ordered Shah Kamal Quhafa and his 12 disciple dervishes to travel to south-western Laur and propagate the religion there. The 13 men, as well as Kamal's wife, then set off from Sheikh Ghat along the Surma River in three small bajras known as pangshi (or panshi). The area which they resided in was originally a cluster of islands in a body of water called Ratnang. It came to be known as Shaharpara (the footmark of Shahs), on the banks of the Ratna river.

Ruknuddin later moved to Kadamhata where he spent the rest of his life preaching. Kadamhata was originally known as Kadamatka, meaning where the footsteps stopped. It is named after Ruknuddin (where his journeying ends). Ruknuddin then established an eidgah in Kadamhata and it would attract many people due to Ruknuddin himself being the imam. His brothers also moved from Shaharpara and settled in Mukam Bazar in Golabganj, Aurampur in Balaganj and Syedpur in Jagannathpur.

Death and legacy
It is unclear how and what year he died, but he is buried in a mazar in Kadamhata, on Kulaura Road (N208) in Rajnagar Upazila. The mazar is close to the Kadamhata Bazar Jame Masjid and Ruknuddin's own eidgah. His urs take place on 13 February, which is considered his death date. His descendants are known as the Syeds of Kadamhata, the well-known poet Syed Shah Nur and novelist and linguist,  Syed Murtaza Ali,  are his descendant. His descendants can also be found in Sampasi, Akamura, Kamarchak and Bijli.

References

People from Baghdad
People from Rajnagar Upazila
14th-century Indian Muslims
Bengali Sufi saints